A hybrid electric truck is a form of truck that uses hybrid electric vehicle (HEV) technology for propulsion, instead of using only a combustion engine.

According to a report from Pike Research, the global market for hybrid medium- and heavy-duty trucks and buses will increase from 9,000 vehicles sold in 2010 to more than 10 times more (more than 100,000 vehicles) in 2015. During this five-year period, the firm forecasts that a total of nearly 300,000 hybrid electric trucks will be sold worldwide.

History 
In 2003, GM introduced a hybrid diesel-electric military (light) truck that is equipped with a diesel electric and a fuel cell auxiliary power unit. Hybrid electric light trucks were introduced in 2004 by Mercedes Benz (Sprinter) and Micro-Vett SPA (Daily Bimodale).

International Truck and Engine Corp. and Eaton Corp. have been selected to manufacture diesel-electric hybrid trucks for a U.S. pilot program that is serving the utility industry in 2004.

Vehicles 

In mid-2005, Isuzu introduced the Elf Diesel Hybrid Truck to the Japanese market. They claim that approximately 300 vehicles, mostly route buses are using the Hinos HIMR (Hybrid Inverter Controlled Motor & Retarder) system. In 2007, high purchase price meant a hard sell for hybrid trucks and appears the first U.S. production hybrid truck (International Durastar Hybrid).

Other vehicles are:
 Big mining machines, for example the Liebherr T 282B dump truck or Keaton Vandersteen LeTourneau L-2350 wheel loader are powered that way. Also there was several models of BelAZ (7530 and 7560 series) in USSR (now in Belarus) since 1970.
 NASA's huge Crawler-Transporters are diesel-electric.
 Mitsubishi Fuso Canter Eco Hybrid is a diesel-electric commercial truck.
 Hino Motors (a Toyota subsidiary) has the world's first production hybrid electric truck in Australia ( diesel engine plus a  electric motor).
 Azure Dynamics Balance Hybrid Electric is a gasoline-hybrid electric medium dutry truck based on the Ford E-450 chassis.
 Volvo FE Hybrid with Volvo Trucks D7F Engine with diesel and parallel hybrid. Suitable for example waste collecting trucks.

Other hybrid petroleum-electric truck makers are DAF Trucks, Hyliion, MAN AG with MAN TGL Series, Nikola Motor Company with the Nikola One, Nissan Motors and Renault Trucks with Renault Puncher.

Consumer trucks:

Ford F-150 PowerBoost
Ford Maverick Hybrid
GMC Sierra 1500 Hybrid
Chevrolet Silverado 1500 Hybrid
Toyota Tundra i-FORCE MAX

Powertrains 

Hybrid electric truck technology and powertrain maker: ZF Friedrichshafen, Eaton Corporation, Azure Dynamics.

Fleets 

Coca-Cola Enterprises (CCE) has the largest fleet of hybrid electric trucks in North America. The hybrid electric tractors are the standard bulk delivery truck that the company uses for large deliveries. CCE plans to incrementally deploy 185 of the hybrid electric trucks across the United States and Canada in 2009, bringing their total number of hybrid electric delivery trucks to 327, the largest such fleet in North America. The company has 142 small hybrid electric delivery vehicles on the road. The trucks are powered by Eaton Corporation's hybrid electric drivetrain systems.

In 2010, the UPS fleet in Philadelphia has expanded with 50 new hybrid electric trucks.

Legislation 

See also 
 Cummins
 Electric bus
 Electric vehicle conversion
 Energy conservation
 Hybrid electric bus
 North American Council for Freight Efficiency
 Plug-in hybrid
 Retrofit
 Rocky Mountain Institute
 Truck classification

References

External links 
 Green Fleet Magazine, Hybrid vehicles.
 Companies Moving Forward with Hybrid Truck Technologies
 Odyne Systems
 XL Hybrids
 Rocky Mountain Institute announces North American Council for Freight Efficiency to help reinvent trucking and carry just as much freight on half the energy
 FedEx Express Gasoline Hybrid Electric Delivery Truck Evaluation: 12 -Month Report, NREL.

Hybrid electric vehicles
Plug-in hybrid vehicles
Trucks